Caladenia saggicola, commonly known as the  spider orchid, is a species of orchid endemic to Tasmania. It has a single erect, hairy leaf and one or two white flowers with very pale reddish lines and black tips.

Description
The flowers are white with very pale reddish lines and the sepals and petals have long, grey to blackish, thread-like tips. Flowering occurs from September to October.

Taxonomy and naming
Caladenia saggicola was first described in 1998 by David Jones from a specimen collected near Cambridge and the description was published in Australian Orchid Research. The specific epithet (saggicola) is a reference to the common name "" sometimes given to Lomatia longifolia which often forms a dense understorey with this orchid.

Distribution and habitat
The sagg spider orchid is only found near Cambridge and Dodges Ferry  where it grows in open woodland with a dense understory of Lomandra longifolia tussocks.

Conservation
Caladenia saggicola is classified as "critically endangered" under the Commonwealth Government Environment Protection and Biodiversity Conservation Act 1999 (EPBC) Act. Only about 450 individual plants are known to survive near Cambridge and three near Dodges Ferry. The main threat to the species is nearby development. Both populations occur on private land; the main habitat is carefully preserved however. Unfavourable fire regimes/uncontrolled bushfire, drought and grazing by rabbits are also threats to the species, although the main habitat is very carefully managed and monitored, and part is in a rabbit-proof fenced area.

References

saggicola
Endemic orchids of Australia
Orchids of Tasmania
Plants described in 1998
Endemic flora of Tasmania
Taxa named by David L. Jones (botanist)